Events in the year 2012 in Monaco.

Incumbents 
 Monarch: Albert II
 State Minister: Michel Roger

Events

January to June 
 29 January – Pauline Ducruet, niece of the Sovereign Prince, launched the 1st edition of the New Generation Circus Festival of Monte Carlo, an offshoot of the International Circus Festival of Monte-Carlo meant for people under the age of 20.
 27 May – Mark Webber won the 2012 Monaco Grand Prix.

July to December

Deaths

See also 

 2012 in Europe
 City states

References 

 
Years of the 21st century in Monaco
2010s in Monaco
Monaco
Monaco